Genç Osman Yavaş (born 1971, in Switzerland) is the former vocalist of the Turkish rock band Mavi Sakal, who appeared in the band's third offering, İki Yol (1997), during Tibet Ağırtan's absence between his two-term frontmanship with the band.

External links 
  http://www.hurriyet.com.tr/cumartesi/5807213.asp

1971 births
Living people
Turkish rock singers
21st-century Turkish singers
21st-century Turkish male singers
Swiss male singers
21st-century Swiss singers
Swiss people of Turkish descent